Ranco may refer to:

Chile - from Mapudungun "Ran - Co" - tormentous water
 Ranco Lake
 Lago Ranco, Chile a city and municipality in Chile 
 Ranco Province

Italy
 Ranco, Lombardy